Desiderio Lebron (born 19 December 1949) is a Dominican Republic judoka. He competed in the men's heavyweight event at the 1984 Summer Olympics.

References

1949 births
Living people
Dominican Republic male judoka
Olympic judoka of the Dominican Republic
Judoka at the 1984 Summer Olympics
Place of birth missing (living people)
Pan American Games medalists in judo
Pan American Games bronze medalists for the Dominican Republic
Judoka at the 1983 Pan American Games
Medalists at the 1983 Pan American Games
21st-century Dominican Republic people
20th-century Dominican Republic people